Troll 2 is a 1990 Italian-American independent dark fantasy horror film written and directed by Claudio Fragasso (under the pseudonym Drake Floyd), and stars Michael Stephenson, George Hardy, Connie McFarland and Jason Wright.

Although produced under the original title Goblins, American distributors marketed it as a sequel to the 1986 horror film Troll; however, the two have no connection, and this film features no trolls but goblins instead. The plot follows young Joshua Waits as he tries to save his family after being warned by the spirit of his deceased grandfather that the town of Nilbog, which the family are spending their vacation at, is actually inhabited by goblins who turn people into plant matter so they can eat them.

The film was produced by Filmirage and the development was rife with difficulties, largely due to the language barrier between the Italian-speaking crew and English-speaking cast, and producer Joe D'Amato's approach to low-budget filmmaking. It was released on October 12, 1990, by Epic Productions and was considered by some as one of the worst movies ever made. In subsequent years, the film gained a cult following and garnered a large fanbase. Though it was generally viewed as poorly made horror, the filmmakers stated that it was "always intended to be a comic film". In 2009, child star Stephenson directed a critically acclaimed documentary about its production and subsequent popularity, humorously titled Best Worst Movie.

Plot

Michael Waits has always dreamed of being a farmer and arranges a home exchange vacation in which he and his family will move into a house in the rural farming community of Nilbog ("goblin" spelled backwards) for a month. The night before the family is scheduled to leave, Michael's son Joshua is contacted by the ghost of his dead grandfather, Seth, warning him that vegetarian goblins want to transform him and his family into plants so that they can eat them. Seth tells Joshua that goblins can transform people into plants by feeding them poisoned food or drink.

Meanwhile, Joshua's sister, Holly, receives a visit from her boyfriend Elliot Cooper. Holly accuses Elliot of being a homosexual since he seems to prefer spending time with his male friends. Elliot promises to show his devotion by accompanying the family on vacation.

The next morning, Elliot fails to arrive and the family leaves without him; they encounter him en route to Nilbog, riding in an RV with his friends Arnold, Drew, and Brent. Outside of Nilbog, Seth appears as a hitchhiker, who warns Joshua that Nilbog is the kingdom of the goblins and that if his family eats anything while they are there, they will be transformed into plants. The family disbelieves Joshua's warnings and continues on to Nilbog, where they meet their strange and aloof exchange family, the Presents. There, Joshua sets about destroying all of the food the family finds or acquires, such as by urinating over a feast prepared for them, with the help of Seth's ghost.

Arnold goes for a walk outside of Nilbog and encounters a girl being chased by goblins. When Arnold approaches them and insults them, they respond by throwing a spear into his chest. They flee to a chapel in the woods, where they encounter the goblins' queen, druid witch Creedence Leonore Gielgud, who uses the "Stonehenge Magic Stone" to give the goblins power. Creedence tricks them into drinking a magic potion that dissolves the girl into vegetable matter which the goblins eat, a horrifying scene witnessed by Arnold that prompts him to scream helplessly while also being transformed into a tree.

The following morning, Michael and Joshua venture into town to buy some food, as there is none in their holiday home. When in town, they find the general store closed, and Michael falls asleep on a bench. Joshua enters the local church and eavesdrops on a goblin church sermon, which bewails the "evils" of eating meat. The parishioners capture him after seeing his skateboard roll into the church and attempt to force-feed him poisonous ice cream; Michael walks in on the scene and becomes suspicious, taking Joshua home.

Later, Drew goes to the town because there is no food or drinks in the RV. The sheriff Gene Freak takes him in his car and gives him a green hamburger. When he arrives in the town, Drew goes to the store and the owner offers him poisonous Nilbog milk. Feeling dizzy, he goes to a chapel and finds Arnold, who has transformed into a tree. Drew drags him out, but Creedence appears. She knocks him out and chainsaws Arnold into pieces. Drew is then killed off-screen.

At the house, the family discovers that the townspeople have prepared them a surprise party to apologize for the events at the church. Joshua attempts to make contact with Seth, only for Creedence to appear in goblin form through the mirror and attack Joshua. Seth's ghost appears and chops her hand off with an axe. Creedence returns to her chapel, where she transforms herself into a beautiful woman in revealing clothes; she then travels to Elliot's RV, where she seduces Brent and drowns him in popcorn.

During the party, Seth and Joshua try to cause a distraction using a molotov cocktail, but the Priest captures them, takes the cocktail, and recites a spell that banishes Seth's soul to hell. However, before he vanishes, Seth summons a bolt of lightning from the sky, which ignites the cocktail and kills the Priest in a fiery explosion. When Michael extinguishes his burning corpse, his true Goblin form is revealed, and the villagers turn on the Waits, revealing themselves all as Goblins. The Waits and Elliot then retreat to the house, where the villagers surround them and hold them hostage.

Joshua, Elliot, Holly, Michael, and Diana hold a séance to communicate with Seth, who returns from the dead and tells them that he can retain a physical form for exactly ten minutes before he has to return to the afterlife. Seth gives Joshua a paper bag containing a "secret weapon" to use against the goblins. The goblins break into the house and transport Joshua to Creedence's chapel, where Joshua opens the bag, revealing a "double-decker bologna sandwich". He eats the sandwich, making his body poisonous to the goblins; he then touches the Stonehenge Stone, along with his family and Elliot, which destroys Creedence and all of the Goblins present.

The family returns home, where Joshua's mother is seen eating food from the refrigerator. The food, unknown to the family, has been poisoned by the family of goblins which is very likely to be the Presents family, who took over their home during their exchange in the country. Joshua then walks in on a group of goblins eating his now-dead mother's green, bloated torso off of the kitchen counter and offering him a bite. Joshua screams in horror at the end.

Cast

 Michael Stephenson as Joshua Waits
 George Hardy as Michael Waits
 Margo Prey as Diana Waits
 Connie McFarland as Holly Waits
 Robert Ormsby as Grandpa Seth
 Deborah Reed as Creedence Leonore Gielgud
 Jason Wright as Elliot Cooper
 Darren Ewing as Arnold
 Jason Steadman as Drew
 David McConnell as Brent
 Gary Carlston as Sheriff Gene Freak
 Mike Hamill as Bells
 Don Packard as Sandy Mahar
 Lance C. Williams as Mr. Presents
 Elli Case as Mrs. Presents
 Gavin Reed as Presents Son
 Melissa Bridge as Presents Daughter

Production
The script—originally titled Goblins—began as a way for director Claudio Fragasso's wife, Rosella Drudi, to express her frustration with several of her friends becoming vegetarians, which she claimed "pissed [her] off". The film was produced by Eduard Sarlui and Joe D'Amato, an Italian exploitation film director notorious for his stated view that the profitability of films was more important than their entertainment value. D'Amato worked under the pseudonym "David Hills". In keeping with D'Amato's production philosophy, many components of the film were created for little to no money, such as the costumes that were designed by D'Amato's longtime friend and frequent collaborator Laura Gemser.

The film was shot on location in Morgan and Porterville, Utah in the summer of 1989; a large "M" erected in the mountains outlying Morgan is visible in some shots. The production crew was made up almost entirely of non-English-speaking Italians brought to America by Fragasso; the only fluent English speaker on set was Gemser. Fragasso and his crew largely relied on a broken pidgin English to communicate with the cast, who recalled not being able to understand much of what went on.

The cast had few experienced actors and was primarily assembled from residents of nearby towns who responded to an open casting call, hoping to win roles as extras. George Hardy was a dentist with no acting experience who showed up for fun, only to be given one of the film's largest speaking roles. Don Packard, who played the store owner, was actually a patient at a nearby mental hospital, and was cast for—⁠and subsequently filmed⁠—his role while on a day trip. He later recalled that he had smoked an enormous amount of marijuana prior to filming, had no idea what was happening around him, and that his disturbed "performance" in the film was not acting.

Drudi and Fragasso have stated that their intentions have been misunderstood, as the strongly criticized aspects of the film are intentionally comic and exaggerated, such as Creedence's theatrical acting or the preacher's monologue on eating meat.

As neither Fragasso nor Drudi spoke fluent English, the shooting script was written in the same broken dialect in which they both spoke; the cast would later recall that the script was only given to them scene-by-scene and that they had difficulty understanding their dialogue as written. Some of the cast members offered to correct their lines to sound more grammatically and syntactically correct but said that Fragasso demanded they deliver their lines verbatim. Despite the majority of the cast attesting to the same story, Fragasso has vehemently denied their version of events, and once reacted angrily to a panel discussion being conducted by the cast, calling the actors "dogs" (Italian for "bad actors") and accusing them of lying about their experiences.

Soundtrack
The film's soundtrack was composed by Carlo Maria Cordio and was played entirely on Roland D-50 and Korg M1 synthesizers, consisting of a few brief themes repeated over and over, including a sped-up M1 demo track. In 2017, the complete score was released on CD, LP and cassette by Lunaris Records.

Reception
Troll 2 is widely considered to be of exceptionally poor quality, and has come to be regarded by the public as one of the worst films ever made. The critical consensus simply reads "Oh my God" in reference to the film's most famous (or infamous) scene. The acting and dialogue have become notorious for their camp value. The scene in which Darren Ewing's character states that he will be eaten next has become an Internet meme, often appearing in videos alongside the "Garbage Day" meme from Silent Night, Deadly Night Part 2. In terms of audience participation, Troll 2 has been compared to the film The Rocky Horror Picture Show, and the two films have been screened together.

J.R. Jones, a reviewer on Chicago Reader, gave the film a negative review and said "The script is stupid, the acting is wooden, the special effects are laughable, the vintage-80s synthesizer score is cheesy. The movie's paranoid premise is boiled down from two superior sci-fi movies, Invasion of the Body Snatchers (1956) and The Day of the Triffids (1962). And there are no trolls.", a staff member on TV Guide, also gave the film a negative review and said "Any attempt to obscure the names of those involved in the making of this fiasco can only be construed as an act of mercy. Troll 2 is really as bad as they come" 

In 2007, a Troll 2-themed event named the "Nilbog Invasion" took place in Morgan, Utah, where part of the film had been shot.

Home media
In 2003, the film was released on DVD by MGM in a Dual Layer version, packaged with the first 1986 Troll film, under the title Troll/Troll². MGM rereleased Troll 2 on DVD and Blu-ray in the United States on October 5, 2010 in honor of the 20th anniversary of the film's release. Scream Factory released a double feature Blu-ray of Troll and Troll 2 on November 17, 2015. The first 5,000 copies included a DVD of Best Worst Movie, the documentary about the production and legacy of Troll 2.

Documentary

The child star of Troll 2, Michael Stephenson, directed Best Worst Movie, a documentary about the film and its cult status. The film debuted on March 14, 2009, at the Alamo Drafthouse South Lamar in Austin, Texas, as part of the South by Southwest film festival. Several cast members from Troll 2 attended the premiere. The screening was followed by a showing of Troll 2. The documentary also screened at major film festivals across the world including the AFI Fest and Sheffield Doc/Fest. A screening at the Tower Theater in Salt Lake City included appearances from much of the cast.

The film won Best Feature Documentary (as voted by the official jury), as well as the Audience Choice for Best Documentary Feature at the 11th annual Sidewalk Moving Picture Festival in September 2009. It was released in spring 2010 and distributed by Area 23 A.

ABC's Nightline ran a segment on Troll 2 and Best Worst Movie in May 2010, including interviews with Hardy and Stephenson.

Sequel
After Troll 2 was released on home video, some regional distributors continued to build on the success of the previous Troll, distributing two other films as sequels: The Crawlers (also known as Troll 3 or Contamination .7) and Quest for the Mighty Sword. The latter film, featuring a hobgoblin using the same goblin suit from Troll 2, was also known as Troll 3 (in Germany, it was released as Troll – Das Schwert der Macht and Troll – Teil 3).

At the Nilbog Invasion, Fragasso and writer Drudi announced plans for a sequel to Troll 2, and the audience was polled for their opinion on what the film should be called. The winning title was Troll 2: Part 2. Fragasso later asked Stephenson to appear in the sequel. However, in 2009, Fragasso said he was no longer interested in directing the film.

The official sequel to Troll 2 was finally released for rent on Amazon Prime Video and DVD/Blu-ray on October 6, 2020, entitled Under ConTroll. This film sees George Hardy reprise his role as Michael Waits and stars Eva Habermann as Vanessa Majer, a woman who is possessed by a troll. The film was directed by Eric Dean Hordes, who co-wrote the screenplay with Alexander König and Simon Hauschild.

See also
 List of films considered the worst

Notes

References

External links

 
 
 

1990 films
1990s comedy horror films
1990 horror films
1990s monster movies
Italian comedy horror films
Dark fantasy films
Films about food and drink
Films about potions
Films about shapeshifting
Films about witchcraft
Films directed by Claudio Fragasso
Films scored by Carlo Maria Cordio
Films shot in Utah
Film and television memes
Italian monster movies
Supernatural fantasy films
Supernatural comedy films
Vegetarianism in fiction
Italian supernatural horror films
1990 comedy films
1990s rediscovered films
English-language Italian films
Goblin films
1990s exploitation films
1990s English-language films